The Ambassador Extraordinary and Plenipotentiary of the Russian Federation to the Republic of Belarus is the official representative of the President and the Government of the Russian Federation to the President and the Government of Belarus.

The ambassador and his staff work at large in the Embassy of Russia in Minsk. There is a consulate general in Brest. The post of Russian Ambassador to Belarus is currently held by Boris Gryzlov, incumbent since 14 January 2022.

History of diplomatic relations

With the dissolution of the Soviet Union in 1991, diplomatic relations between the Russian Federation and the Republic of Belarus were first established on 25 June 1992.

Representatives of the Russian Federation to the Republic of Belarus (1992 – present)

References

 
Belarus
Russia